Major Henry Kelly VC, MC & Bar (10 July 1887 – 18 July 1960) was an English recipient of the Victoria Cross, the highest and most prestigious award for gallantry in the face of the enemy that can be awarded to British and Commonwealth forces.

Kelly was born on 10 July 1887 in Collyhurst, Manchester. He was a temporary second lieutenant in the 10th Battalion, The Duke of Wellington's (West Riding) Regiment during the First World War at the time of his award of the Victoria Cross in 1916. He was awarded a Military Cross and later a Bar to that medal in Italy in 1918. Other Military awards include the Belgian Croix de guerre, the French Médaille militaire and the Spanish Grand Laurelled Cross of San Fernando.

Early life
Henry Kelly was born to Charles Kelly of Dublin and Jane (née McGarry) of Manchester. He was left the oldest of 10 children after his father died in 1904. He was educated at St Patrick's School and Xaverian College, both in Manchester. After moving to King Street in Moston, he was employed as a sorting clerk at the Newton Street sorting office and trained with the 'Manchester Royal Engineers territorial Regiment'.On 5 September 1914, aged 27, he enlisted into the Queen's Own Cameron Highlanders as a private. He transferred to the Manchester Regiment and became a lance corporal and two weeks later a sergeant major. He was commissioned as a second lieutenant on 12 May 1915 into the Duke of Wellington's Regiment (West Riding Regiment). On 29 October 1918 he was awarded the Victoria Cross, and, after being presented with his VC ribbon by the corps commander on 11 September, he was made a temporary lieutenant.

Award of Victoria Cross

On 4 October 1916, when Kelly was 29 years old, he performed an act of bravery at Le Sars, France, for which he was awarded the Victoria Cross. Later he was also awarded the Belgian Croix de guerre and the French Médaille militaire.

Award of Military Cross
In June 1918, as a Captain serving in the 10th Battalion, Kelly saw action in Italy on the Asiago Plateau, where he led a company and a half on a successful raid on Ave, to the south of Asiago, on the night of 21–22 June, after which he was awarded the Military Cross.

Award of Bar to Military Cross
Kelly was involved in later actions on Il Montello above the river Piave On 27 October 1918 during the Piave he led another successful attack across the Piave, after which he was awarded a bar to his Military Cross.

Kelly left the army in 1920, having been promoted to the rank of Temporary Major and put in charge of a rest camp in France.

Between the wars
Kelly spent 1922–1923 in the Irish National Army during the Irish Civil War, then later joined the International Brigades, in 1936, as a foreign volunteer fighting against Fascists in the Spanish Civil War and was ranked Commandante General. Here he was awarded the Grand Laurelled Cross of San Fernando.

At the outbreak of the Second World War in 1939, aged 52, he rejoined the British army and served from thence as a lieutenant in the Cheshire Regiment. From October 1943 until February 1944 he was placed in charge of the District Claims office of London District, at Curzon Street. He was at that time court martialled and severely reprimanded for making an allegedly false claim for £2 10s. He later resigned his commission and left the army to return to work for the post office.

Post war

Kelly continued to work for the post office and lived in Wythenshawe, Manchester. Following a long illness Kelly died, on 18 January 1960, in Prestwich Hospital. He was buried in Southern Cemetery, Manchester.

Medal location
Kelly's Victoria Cross is displayed in The Duke of Wellington's Regimental Museum, located within the Bankfield Museum, Halifax, West Yorkshire, England.

References

Further reading
Irish Winners of the Victoria Cross (Richard Doherty & David Truesdale, 2000)
Monuments to Courage (David Harvey, 1999)
The Register of the Victoria Cross (This England, 1997)
VCs of the First World War - The Somme (Gerald Gliddon, 1994)

1887 births
1960 deaths
Manchester Regiment soldiers
Duke of Wellington's Regiment officers
Cheshire Regiment officers
People from Moston, Manchester
British people of the Spanish Civil War
British Army personnel of World War I
British Battle of the Somme recipients of the Victoria Cross
British Army personnel of World War II
Recipients of the Croix de guerre (Belgium)
Recipients of the Military Cross
English people of Irish descent
British Army recipients of the Victoria Cross
Burials at Southern Cemetery, Manchester
Military personnel from Manchester
Queen's Own Cameron Highlanders soldiers